Christian Gentner (born 14 August 1985) is a German professional football official and a former player who played as a midfielder. He works as a head of the professional player department at VfB Stuttgart. He won the Bundesliga twice, with VfB Stuttgart in 2007 and VfL Wolfsburg in 2009. He was also called up five times to the senior Germany national team.

Club career
Before joining VfB Stuttgart, Gentner played at TSV Beuren and VfL Kirchheim.

In the 2004–05 season, he played 28 times and scored six times for the Regionalliga (third division) team of VfB Stuttgart. In the same season, he had his Bundesliga debut against Hertha BSC on 20 February 2005 (1–0). He scored his first goal in a UEFA Cup game against Domžale on 25 September 2005.

In 2006, Gentner's contract in Stuttgart was extended until 2010.

On 18 July 2007, he was loaned to VfL Wolfsburg until summer 2009 and on 11 August 2008 Gentner signed a permanent deal with Wolfsburg.

On 8 January 2010, Gentner announced that he would be joining VfB Stuttgart at the end of the season. After seeing out his contract with the Wolves which ended on 1 July 2010, Gentner returned to Stuttgart on a free transfer.

On 6 January 2013, Gentner extended his contract with VfB Stuttgart until June 2016 with an option for a further year. Following Serdar Tasci's departure to Spartak Moscow, it was announced that Gentner is to be his successor as the new club captain. In May 2016 Gentner extended his contract with VfB Stuttgart until June 2019.

On 5 July 2019, Gentner signed a contract with club Union Berlin.

In September 2022, Gentner announced that he would retire from playing at the end of 2022. At the same time, VfB Stuttgart announced that he would join the club on 1 January 2023 as head of the professional player department.

International career
On 19 May 2009, Gentner was called up to the senior Germany national team for their tour of Asia. He made his debut against China on 29 May 2009.

Personal life
His brother Thomas Gentner plays for TuS Koblenz.

On 15 December 2018, Gentner's father died at Stuttgart's stadium, just after Stuttgart had beaten Hertha BSC 2–1.

Career statistics

Honours
VfB Stuttgart
Bundesliga: 2006–07
2. Bundesliga: 2016–17

VfL Wolfsburg
Bundesliga: 2008–09

Individual
Bundesliga Goal of the Month: August 2013

References

External links

 
 
 

1985 births
Living people
People from Nürtingen
Sportspeople from Stuttgart (region)
German footballers
Association football midfielders
Germany B international footballers
Germany youth international footballers
Germany international footballers
VfL Kirchheim/Teck players
VfB Stuttgart players
VfB Stuttgart II players
VfL Wolfsburg players
1. FC Union Berlin players
FC Luzern players
Bundesliga players
2. Bundesliga players
Swiss Super League players
Footballers from Baden-Württemberg
German expatriate footballers
German expatriate sportspeople in Switzerland
Expatriate footballers in Switzerland